Zedekiah is a masculine given name of Hebrew origins. It is most commonly associated with Zedekiah (c. 618 BC–after 586 BC), a Biblical figure and the last monarch of the Kingdom of Judah. The name is also used by the following:

People with the given name Zedekiah 
 Zedekiah (High Priest), High Priest of Solomon's Temple
 Zedekiah Smith Barstow (1790–1873), American minister of the Congregational church.
 Zedekiah Belknap (1781–1858), American portraitist
 Zedekiah ben Abraham Anaw, 13th-century author of Halakhic works
 Zedekiah Kidwell (1814–1872), 19th-century politician, physician, lawyer, teacher and clerk
 Zedekiah Otieno (born 1968), retired Kenyan footballer
 Zedekiah Johnson Purnell (1813–1882), African-American activist, businessman, and literary editor.

Other uses 
 Zedekiah's Cave, an underground meleke limestone quarry, under the Muslim Quarter of the Old City of Jerusalem.

Masculine given names
Given names of Hebrew language origin